{{DISPLAYTITLE:Upsilon2 Cancri}}

Upsilon2 Cancri (υ2 Cancri) is a faint, yellow-hued star in the zodiac constellation of Cancer. It is near the lower brightness limit of stars that can be viewed with the naked eye, having an apparent visual magnitude of +6.35. Based upon an annual parallax shift of 5.1325 mas as seen from our orbit, this system is roughly 635 light-years away.

This is an evolved G-type giant star with a stellar classification of G9 III. Upsilon2 Cancri is a member of the Epsilon Indi Moving Group of stars that share a common motion through space.

References

G-type giants
Cancri, Upsilon2
Cancer (constellation)
BD+24 1946
Cancri, 32
072324
041940
3369